The Sweden women's national football team represents Sweden at international women's association football competitions and is controlled by the Swedish Football Association.

History 
The Swedish team has been traditionally recognized as one of the world's best women's teams and won the 1984 European Competition for Women's Football. Like the equally successful men's counterpart, the women's team also became runners-up at a World Cup (2003) and three European Championships (1987, 1995 and 2001), as well as participating at six Olympic Games, eight World Cups and ten European Championships. Sweden also finished third at the 1991, 2011 and 2019 World Cups.

The 2003 World Cup-final was the only second time Sweden ever reached the final of a FIFA World Cup after the 1958 FIFA World Cup Final, and was the second most watched event in Sweden that year. Lotta Schelin is the top goalscorer in the history of Sweden with 85 goals. Schelin surpassed Hanna Ljungberg's 72-goal record against Germany on 29 October 2014. The player with the most caps is Caroline Seger, with 229. The team was coached by Thomas Dennerby from 2005 to 2012, and Pia Sundhage from 2012 to 2017. The current head coach is Peter Gerhardsson.

After winning the two qualifying matches against Denmark for the Beijing 2008 Olympics, the Swedish Olympic Committee approved of record increases in investments for the women's team. The new budget granted over a million SEK (about US$150,000) for the team and 150,000 SEK (about US$25,000) per player for developing physical fitness. The new grants are almost a 100% increase of the 2005 and 2006 season funds.

The developments and conditions of the Sweden women's national football team from its beginnings until 2013 can be seen in the 2013 three-part Sveriges Television documentary television series The Other Sport.

Team image

Home stadium 
The Sweden women's national football team play their home matches at Gamla Ullevi.

Results and fixtures 

The following is a list of match results in the last 12 months, as well as any future matches that have been scheduled. All times are local.

Legend

2022

2023

Coaching staff

Current coaching staff 

Technical staff

Manager history 

Statistics as of 26 July 2022.

 Players 

 Current squad 
Recent call-ups 
The following players have been named to a Sweden squad in the last 12 months.

 

 INJNotes: INJ Player withdrew from the squad due to injury
 POS Match was postponed
 PRE Preliminary squad
 RET Retired from the national team
 WD Player withdrew from the squad due to non-injury issue

 Previous squads 

FIFA Women's World Cup
1991 FIFA Women's World Cup
1995 FIFA Women's World Cup
1999 FIFA Women's World Cup
2003 FIFA Women's World Cup
2007 FIFA Women's World Cup
2011 FIFA Women's World Cup
2015 FIFA Women's World Cup
2019 FIFA Women's World Cup

Olympic Games
1996 Summer Olympics
2000 Summer Olympics
2004 Summer Olympics
2008 Summer Olympics
2012 Summer Olympics
2016 Summer Olympics
2020 Summer Olympics

UEFA Women's Championship
1984 UEFA Women's Championship
1987 UEFA Women's Championship
1989 UEFA Women's Championship
UEFA Women's Euro 1995
UEFA Women's Euro 1997
UEFA Women's Euro 2001
UEFA Women's Euro 2005
UEFA Women's Euro 2009
UEFA Women's Euro 2013
UEFA Women's Euro 2017

 Player records Active players in bold, statistics as of 6 September 2022.

Most capped players

Top goalscorers

Competitive record

FIFA Women's World Cup

Olympic Games

UEFA Women's Championship

Algarve Cup 
The Algarve Cup is a global invitational tournament for national teams in women's soccer hosted by the Portuguese Football Federation (FPF). Held annually in the Algarve region of Portugal since 1994, it is one of the most prestigious women's football events, alongside the Women's World Cup and Women's Olympic Football.

Head-to-head record 
The following table shows Sweden's all-time international record from 1973.

FIFA world rankings 

 Worst Ranking   Best Ranking   Worst Mover   Best Mover

Honours

Intercontinental 
Olympic Games
  Silver medalist: 2016, 2020
FIFA Women's World Cup
  Runner-up: 2003
  Third place: 1991, 2011, 2019

Continental 
UEFA Women's Euro
  Champion: 1984
  Runner-up: 1987, 1995, 2001
  Third place: 1989 (not determined after 1993)

Regional 
Algarve Cup
  Champion: 1995, 2001, 2009, 2018
  Runner-up: 1996
  Third place: 1994, 1997, 2002, 2006, 2007, 2010
Nordic Championship
  Champion: 1977, 1978, 1979, 1980, 1981
  Runner-up: 1974, 1975, 1976, 1982
Cyprus Tournament
  Champion: 1990, 1992
North America Cup
  Champion: 1987
Australia Cup
  Champion: 2003

See also 

Sport in Sweden
Football in Sweden
Women's football in Sweden
Sweden women's national football team
Sweden women's national football team results
List of Sweden women's international footballers
Sweden women's national under-19 football team
Sweden women's national under-17 football team
Sweden women's national futsal team

Notes

References

External links 

Official website 
FIFA profile
[ Sweden international footballers (1973–2017)]
[ Sweden international matches (1973–2017)]

 
European women's national association football teams
UEFA Women's Championship-winning countries